Baluch Regiment may refer to:

the 10th Baluch Regiment of the Indian Army (1895–1947)
the successor Baloch Regiment of the Pakistan Army